Chinese Peak is a summit in Fresno County, California, in the United States. China Peak ski area is situated on the mountain.

The mountain was named for Yung Lee, a local Chinese shepherd.

References

Mountains of Fresno County, California
Mountains of Northern California